Anastasiya Turchyn (born 3 January 1995) is a Ukrainian judoka. She is the bronze medalist of the 2021 Judo Grand Slam Kazan in the -78 kg category. She competed in the women's 78 kg event at the 2020 Summer Olympics in Tokyo, Japan. 
Anastasiya was born in Rivne to Brazilian and Ukrainian parents.

References

External links
 

1995 births
Living people
Ukrainian female judoka
Ukrainian people of Brazilian descent
Judoka at the 2020 Summer Olympics
Olympic judoka of Ukraine
European Games competitors for Ukraine
Judoka at the 2019 European Games
21st-century Ukrainian women